Richard Augustus Willoughby Green (August 1836 – 6 September 1921) was an Australian rowing champion who won 275 of his 346 races, including several in England.

History 
RAW (“Dick”) Green was born in Sydney, Australia, a son of shipbuilder, George Green and Maria (nee Bates). George Green had come to Australia at a very young age in 1825 and taken up his apprenticeship. His shipyard was later based at Greenwich, on Sydney Harbour [family knowledge].  The Green family’s life revolved around the water - building various types of craft, often of innovative design, 
for the young colony, with some employed as pilots on the harbour. George and his sons were also very competitive in sailing and rowing, a sport in which several generations have since excelled.

Dick Green was, in 1863, the first Australian champion sculler to compete in England. At the Thames National Regatta 21 July 1863 he won:
Pair oars race
Scullers race
In the single sculls match against Robert Chambers for £400 prize money, he led for much of the way before he became ill and had to withdraw. Green requested a rematch, which Chambers initially accepted but later declined. It was later claimed that Green had won the rematch by forfeit.

References 

1836 births
1921 deaths
Australian male rowers